The Melbourne Palestine Solidarity Network (MPSN) are a grouping of individuals, community groups and activists based in Melbourne, Australia. They oppose what they see as Israeli aggression towards not just Palestinians but neighboring countries such as Lebanon. MPSN is known for organising demonstrations and campaigns against Israel and its supporters.

References

External links
 Melbourne Palestine Solidarity Network website

Non-governmental organizations involved in the Israeli–Palestinian peace process
Palestinian solidarity movement